Jean Hélène (8 August 1953 in Mulhouse – 21 October 2003) was a French journalist specializing in Africa.  He was working for Radio France Internationale in Ivory Coast when he was killed in Abidjan by police Sergeant Théodore Séry Dago. Jean Hélène was his press name, Christian Baldensberger being his real name.

Controversial Journalism
Earlier, Jean Hélène had served as the Le Monde correspondent in Rwanda.  His coverage of the Rwandan genocide during this period was biased in favour of the Hutus.  In particular, during the early months when thousands of civilians were butchered, he characterized the killings as those of enemy combatants.  
A French court ruling in May 1999 says:
Considering that an examination of the press cuttings entered into evidence shows that during the first two months of the conflict Le Monde, through its correspondent, Jean Helene, highlighted the "civil war" aspect of the conflict...

Murder and Trial

On 21 October 2003, in a prevailing atmosphere of rabid anti-French sentiment during the Civil war in Côte d'Ivoire, Hélène had gone to the Abidjan police headquarters to interview some government opponents who had just been released from detention. Apparently he had an altercation with Sergeant Dago over parking, following which Dago went inside, grabbed an AK-47 and shot him dead 
as he was walking from his car, talking on his mobile phone.

Sergeant Dago was immediately arrested and apparently confessed to the crime.  Subsequently however, he changed his position claiming that he had come inside the building after talking to Helene when he heard the shots that killed him.

There was wide international condemnation of the event. 
Amnesty international said: 
The fact that a sergeant can kill a journalist who posed no threat to him in cold blood shows the atmosphere of impunity in which Côte d’Ivoire security forces have been operating.

After the event, Théodore Séry Dago became a hero and a Dago 
support committee was formed. 

In January 2004, a military court under judge 
Ahmed Lanzéni Coulibaly considered ballistic evidence which indicated
that the bullet had been shot from Dago's service weapon, and 
found him guilty of having
"deliberately killed" Helene. Dago was sentenced to 17 years in prison.

References

External links
  Radio France Internationale website
  Radio France Internationale website

1953 births
2003 deaths
Writers from Mulhouse
People of the Rwandan genocide
Deaths by firearm in Ivory Coast
Journalists killed while covering military conflicts
Assassinated French journalists
French people murdered abroad
People murdered in Ivory Coast
French male non-fiction writers
20th-century French journalists
20th-century French male writers